The , or simply Amuse Museum, was a private museum specializing in Japanese textile culture and ukiyo-e. It opened on 1 November 2009 in Asakusa, Tokyo, not too far from Ueno Park, where multiple other museums are located. The museum was closed on 31 March 2019.

The museum housed a collection of everyday clothing and other textiles from the private collection of folklorist Chūzaburō Tanaka. While only about 1500 of the items were on display at any time, the museum rotated through the collection every few months.

The talent and entertainment agency Amuse was the owner of the museum.

General information
Amuse Museum was established on 1 November 2009 as a private Japanese textile culture and ukiyo-e museum in the Asakusa district of the Taitō special ward of Tokyo, Japan. It is located just east of Sensō-ji. The museum was operated and owned by the talent and entertainment agency Amuse. The concept of the museum curation, was based on the environmental and social activism of Nobel Peace Prize winner Wangari Maathai.

The museum's collections were started with over 30,000 everyday clothing items from the collection of the folklorist Chūzaburō Tanaka. Many of the pieces were in disrepair and appeared to be loosely sewn rags. About 1500 of those items were on display at any one time, and the pieces on display were rotated out every few months.

The honorary curator of Amuse Museum was Tanaka, and the Chief Curator was Kiyoshi Tatsumi.

Access and environs
Amuse Museum was located about 5 minutes' walk north-northwest of Asakusa Station on the Ginza Line and about 8 minutes from Asakusa Station on the Tsukuba Express line. There are two bus stops within a block of the museum's former location. The Asakusa Shrine and Sensō-ji are located just west of the former museum site.

Other nearby attractions within walking distance included Kaminarimon, Kyu-Iwasaki-tei Garden, the National Museum of Nature and Science, the National Museum of Western Art, Tokyo Metropolitan Art Museum, Tokyo National Museum, Ueno Zoo, and Ueno Park (which contains the four museums above, as well as the zoo).

A bar was located on the sixth floor of the museum building offering drinks snack items.

Exhibit history
In 2010, Amuse Museum hosted the "Tsugaru – Nanbu Sashiko Kimono" collection, consisting of 768 pieces of sashiko kimonos from Tsugara and Nanbu in Aomori Prefecture.

Permanent collection

The motifs found in the Boro exhibit inspired fashion designers such as Louis Vuitton, Hiroyuki Horihata, Makiko Sekiguchi, Joseph Altuzarra, and Junya Watanabe. Vuitton incorporated Boro motifs into his 2013 Spring/Summer Paris men's collection, and Altuzarra incorporated them into his 2014 Spring/Summer New York men's collection. Watanabe, a designer for Comme des Garçons, used the motif for his Spring/Summer 2015 collection.

References

External links
Where in Tokyo (review)
Time Out Tokyo (review)

Amuse Inc.
Defunct museums in Japan
Defunct art museums and galleries
Art museums and galleries in Tokyo
Buildings and structures in Taitō
Japanese clothing
Ukiyo-e Museum
Art museums established in 2009
Museums disestablished in 2019
2009 establishments in Japan
2019 disestablishments in Japan